Povilas Butkevičius (born 26 September 1987) is a Lithuanian former professional basketball player.

Professional career
From 2004-2005, till 2011-2012, he was part of Lithuanian powerhouse Žalgiris Kaunas.

On 17 August 2010 he was loaned to BC Prienai for the season. August 11, 2011 he was again loaned to Prienai.

In July 2014 he signed a contract with Italian team Novipiù Casale Monferrato.

On 28 July 2015 he returned to Lithuania to play for Vytautas Prienai-Birštonas.

On 22 September 2016 Butkevičius signed with BC Vytis playing only 16 games, because of shoulder injury. He averaged 5.4 points ant 5.6 rebounds.
In that season team won bronze medals in NKL. On 20 May he announced his retirement from basketball because of injuries, despite being only 29 years old.

National team career
Butkevičius was a team leader in 2007 for the Lithuanian U-20 national team, he was the top rebounder in the 2007 FIBA Europe Under-20 Championship.

Achievements
 Estonian Basketball League Champion (2007)
 Baltic Basketball League Challenge Cup Champion (2008)
 LSKL Champion (2009)
 Baltic Basketball League Second Place (2009)
 Lithuanian Basketball League Second Place (2009)
 Baltic Basketball League Champion (2010)
 Lithuanian Basketball League Second Place (2010)
 Lithuanian Basketball League Third Place (2011, 2012)
 National Basketball League Third Place (2017)

References 

1987 births
Living people
Lithuanian men's basketball players
LSU-Atletas basketball players
People from Biržai
University of Tartu basketball team players
Centers (basketball)
Power forwards (basketball)
Lithuanian expatriate basketball people in Estonia